

Events and publications

Year overall

January
 January 11: The Crab with the Golden Claws premiers, a stop-motion film directed by Claude Misonne (pseudonym for Simone Swaelens). This is the first animated film based on Hergé's popular comics series The Adventures of Tintin.
 January 13: Milton Caniff's Steve Canyon makes its newspaper debut.
 January: Jean-Michel Charlier and Victor Hubinon's Buck Danny makes its debut in Spirou. 
 Captain America Comics (1941 series) #60 - Timely Comics
 Marvel Mystery Comics (1939 series) #80 - Timely Comics
 Eerie, a one-shot horror comic book published by Avon Periodicals as Eerie #1. The book holds the distinction of being the first true, stand-alone horror comic book and is credited with establishing the horror comics genre.

February

March
 March 10: Marten Toonder's Tom Poes is resyndicated in the Dutch newspapers De Nieuwe Rotterdamsche Courant and De Volkskrant after being interrupted since the Liberation in 1944. 
 Captain America Comics (1941 series) #61 - Timely Comics
 Marvel Mystery Comics (1939 series) #81 - Timely Comics
 The first episode of Harry Hanan's comic series Louie is published. The series will run until 1976.

April
 April 3: The Flemish comics magazine 't Kapoentje makes its debut. It wil run until 1989.
 April 11: Peyo first publishes his comic strip Johan in La Dernière Heure, which will become Johan and Peewit in 1954.
 April 14: The first issue of the Filipino comics magazine Bulaklak Magazine is published.
 April 14: Charles Kuhn's newspaper comic Grandma makes its debut. 
 April 26: Marten Toonder's Tom Poes story De Watergeest is first published. Halfway the story major Dirk Dickerdack and Markies de Canteclaer  make their debut. 
 Captain America Comics (1941 series) #62 - Timely Comics
 Human Torch Comics (1940 series) #26 - Timely Comics
 Sub-Mariner Comics (1941 series) #22 - Timely Comics
 The first episode of Lib Abrena's Ipo-Ipo is published.

May
 Marvel Mystery Comics (1939 series) #82 - Timely Comics

June
 June 8: The first episode of Charles M. Schulz' Li'l Folks is published. It will run until 1950.
 June 21: Marten Toonder's Tom Poes story De Talisman is first published. Halfway the story the antagonist Joris Goedbloed makes his debut. He will later also become a recurring character in Panda.
 June 29: Marc Sleen first publishes his gag cartoon series De Ronde van Frankrijk, in which he chronicles every tournament of the annual Tour de France. He will continue this series up and until July 1964.
 The Dutch comics magazine Sjors, which was already published between 1936 and 1942, reappears but every two weeks instead of each week.
Sub-Mariner Comics (1941 series) #23 - Timely Comics

July
 July 1: Willy Vandersteen leaves newspaper De Nieuwe Gids and takes his successful comics series Suske en Wiske with him. About 25.0000 readers instantly subscribe to De Standaard, the paper where the series will be published from now on.
 July 23: Mars Ravelo and Nestor Redondo 's superheroine Varga (renamed Darna from 1950 on) makes her debut in Bulaklak Magazine. 
 Captain America Comics (1941 series) #63 - Timely Comics
Human Torch Comics (1940 series) #27 - Timely Comics
 Marvel Mystery Comics (1939 series) #83 - Timely Comics

August
 August 24: In one episode of Will Eisner's The Spirit the Spirit is temporarily blinded and remains to for several episodes.
 Malang's Kosme the Cop makes its debut.

September
 September 22: In the Mickey Mouse story The Man of Tomorrow by Billy Walsh and Floyd Gottfredson Eega Beeva makes his debut.
Hoppy the Marvel Bunny, with issue #15, canceled by Fawcett Comics.

October
 October 2: Marc Sleen's comic strip De Avonturen van Detectief Van Zwam starring Detective Van Zwam makes its debut in the newspaper De Nieuwe Gids. Halfway the story Van Zwam meets Nero who will soon become his sidekick and eventually the main protagonist of the series, which will then be known as The Adventures of Nero. It will run uninterruptedly until 2002 and is drawn singlehandedly by Sleen for its first 45 years.
 Captain America Comics (1941 series) #64 - Timely Comics
Human Torch Comics (1940 series) #28 - Timely Comics
 Marvel Mystery Comics (1939 series) #84 - Timely Comics

November
 November 6: After Willy Vandersteen's departure 't Kapoentje lets Bob De Moor create a replacement comic for Vandersteen's De Vrolijke Bengels, which becomes the long-running series De Lustige Kapoentjes. De Moor's version will continue until December 1949. 
 November 28: The Dutch comics magazine Tom Poes Weekblad based on the popularity of Marten Toonder's Tom Poes makes its debut, but will only last until June 1951. One of the features to debut in the magazine is the comic series Bas en Van der Pluim by Frits Godhelp. 
Human Torch Comics (1940 series) #29 - Timely Comics
 More Fun Comics, with issue #127 (November/December cover date), is cancelled by DC Comics.
Sub-Mariner Comics (1941 series) #24 - Timely Comics

December

 The Donald Duck story Christmas on Bear Mountain is published, which marks the debut of Scrooge McDuck.
 The first issue of the Dutch comics magazine Okidoki is published, which in 1949 will change its name into Jumbo.It will run until 1951.

Specific date unknown
 Helge Hall Jensen's long-running comics series Hans og Grete makes its debut.
 The Girl Guides make their debut in Rupert Bear.
 In the Kapitein Rob story Het Pinguïnland van Professor Lupardi Kapitein Rob's mortal enemy Professor Lupardi makes his debut.
 Larry Alcala's Siopawman and the long-running series Kalabog & Bosyo makes their debut.

Births

Deaths

February
 February 10: Charles A. Voight, American comics artist (Betty), passes away at age 60.
 February 13: Wiley Padan, American illustrator and comics artist (It's True!), dies at age 46 from a heart condition.
 February 27: Cemal Nadir Güler, Turkish comics artist (Amcabey, Efruz Bey, Dalkavuk, Akla Kara, Yeni Zengin), dies at age 44.

March
 March 24: Frank Rocky Fiegel, American tramp and bar bouncer (inspiration for Popeye), dies at age 79.

April
 April 1: Crawford Young, American comics artist (Clarence, Pearl Button, The Tutts), dies at age 61.

May 
 May 2: William Moulton Marston, American psychologist and comics writer (Wonder Woman), dies at age 53.
 May 16: Reginald Perrott, British illustrator and comics artist (worked for Amalgamated Press and Mickey Mouse Weekly), passes away at age 32 from throat cancer.

August
 August 20: Max Gaines, American comics publisher (founder of All-American Publications, nowadays EC Comics), dies at age 52 in a boat accident.

October
 October 10: Joseph Jacinto Mora, Uruguayan-American illustrator, photographer, writer, sculptor, comics artist (Animaldom), dies at age 60.
 November 16: John Prentiss Benson, American painter, architect,  illustrator and comics artist (The Woozlebeasts), dies at age 82.

Specific date unknown
 Mabel Francis Taylor, British illustrator and comics artist (The Little Sparrowkins, continued Jungle Jinks), passes away at age 80 or 81.
 Rocha Vieira, Portuguese comics artist (Fitas de Juca e Zeca, As Proezas de Necas e Tonecas), dies at age 63 or 64.
 Joan D'Ivori, aka Joan Vila i Pujol, Spanish illustrator, painter and publisher (made some sequential illustrations), passes away at age 56 or 57.

First issues by title
A Date with Judy (cover dated October–November) by DC Comics

First appearance by character
Black Canary in Flash Comics #86(August), created by Robert Kanigher and Carmine Infantino - DC Comics
Casey the Cop by DC Comics in Action Comics
Dagar, the Desert Hawk by Fox Feature Syndicate in All Great Comics #13 (December)
Doctor Light (Arthur Light) in All American Comics #82 (February), DC Comics
Gentleman Ghost in Flash Comics #88 (October), created by Robert Kanigher and Joe Kubert - DC Comics
Harlequin (comics) in All American Comics #89 (September), created by Robert Kanigher - DC Comics
Paula Brooks in Sensation Comics #68 (August), created by Mort Meskin - DC Comics
Icicle (comics) in All-American Comics #90 (October), created by Robert Kanigher and Irwin Hasen - DC Comics
Per Degaton in All Star Comics # 35(June), created by John Broome and Irwin Hasen - DC Comics
Sportsmaster in All-American Comics #85 (May), created by John Broome and Irwin Hasen - DC Comics
Thorn (comics) in Flash Comics #89 (November), created by John Broome and Carmine Infantino - DC Comics
Tomahawk (comics) in Star-Spangled Comics #69 (June) created by Joe Samachson and Edmund Good - DC Comics
Tommy Tomorrow in Real Fact Comics #6 (January), created by Jack Schiff and George Kashdan - DC Comics
Wizard (DC Comics) in All Star Comics #34 (April), created by Gardner Fox and Irwin Hasen - DC Comics

References